The Muppet Show is the first soundtrack album released from the TV show of the same name. It reached number one in the UK Albums Chart in the week ending 25 June 1977. In 1979, The album won The Grammy Award for Best Album for Children.

Overview
The album includes selected songs from Season 1 of the Muppet Show as well as comedy sketches and various unlisted short skits, including interjections by Muppet characters Statler and Waldorf.

Track listing
Side A
"The Muppet Show Theme"
"Mississippi Mud"
"Mahna Mahna"
"The Great Gonzo Eats a Rubber Tyre to the Flight of the Bumblebee"
"Mr. Bassman"
"Cottleston Pie"
"The Amazing Marvin Suggs and His Muppaphone Play Lady of Spain"
"Lydia the Tattooed Lady"
"Halfway Down the Stairs"

Side B
"Tenderly"
"I'm in Love with a Big Blue Frog"	 
"Tit Willow"
"Veterinarian Hospital – Soap Opera"
"Simon Smith and His Amazing Dancing Bear"
"What Now My Love"
"A Monologue by Fozzie Bear"
"Trees"
"Sax and Violence"
"Bein' Green"

Muppet performers
Jim Henson as Kermit the Frog, Dr. Teeth, Rowlf the Dog, Swedish Chef, Waldorf, and The Newsman 
Frank Oz as Fozzie Bear, Miss Piggy, Animal, Sam the Eagle, and Marvin Suggs
Jerry Nelson as Floyd Pepper, Robin the Frog, Country Trio, and Uncle Deadly
Richard Hunt as Scooter, Sweetums, Statler, Wayne, and Mildred
Dave Goelz as Gonzo, Zoot, Bunsen Honeydew, and Muppy
Eren Ozker as Hilda, Wanda, and Janice
John Lovelady as Crazy Harry and Nigel
Fran Brill as Mary Louise

Charts

Weekly charts

Year-end charts

Certifications and sales

Reception
Allmusic found the album "a lost treasure with all those Jim Henson characters brimming with life. Even without the visuals, this LP has all the trappings of their successful variety show of the late '70s, when the Muppets were at the height of their popularity."

References

External links

Television soundtracks
The Muppets albums
1977 soundtrack albums
Arista Records albums
Pye Records albums